The 1892 Richmond Colts football team was an American football team that represented Richmond College—now known as the University of Richmond—as an independent during the 1892 college football season. Led by Penwick Shelton in his first and only year as head coach, Richmond compiled a record of 2–3.

Schedule

References

Richmond
Richmond Spiders football seasons
Richmond Colts football